The Nationalist Party Shadow Cabinet of Dr Simon Busuttil was announced on May 14, 2013. It was formed following the 9 March election which replaced the PN majority with a Labour majority.

Former Prime Minister and Leader of the Nationalist Party Leader Dr Lawrence Gonzi announced his retirement and resigned from parliament on July 17, 2013. Upon his resignation, Dr Chris Said's election as Secretary General of the Nationalist Party on June 5, 2013, and Mr Antoine Borg's casual election to parliament on July 30, 2013, Dr Simon Busuttil announced changes in the shadow cabinet on August 3, 2013.

List
 Dr Simon Busuttil – Leader of the Opposition
 Dr Mario de Marco – Deputy Leader of the Opposition for Parliamentary Affairs and Spokesperson for the Economy, Investment and Small Business
 Dr Beppe Fenech Adami – Deputy Leader of the Opposition for Party Affairs and Spokesperson for Justice
 Dr Chris Said - Secretary General of the Party
 Mr Ċensu Galea – Deputy Speaker and Spokesperson for Agriculture and Fisheries
 Mr David Agius – Group Whip and Spokesperson for Local Government
 Mr Frederick Azzopardi – Group Deputy Whip and Spokesperson for Gozo (health services and education)
 Ms Giovanna Debono – Spokesperson for Gozo
 Mr George Pullicino – Spokesperson for Energy and the Conservation of Water
 Mr Tonio Fenech – Spokesperson for Finance
 Dr Joseph Cassar – Spokesperson for Education
 Dr Jason Azzopardi – Spokesperson for Home Affairs and National Security
 Dr Francis Zammit Dimech – Spokesperson for Culture and Communications
 Dr Carm Mifsud Bonnici – Spokesperson for Foreign Affairs
 Mr Clyde Puli – Spokesperson for the Family and Social Solidarity
 Mr Mario Galea – Spokesperson for the Elderly
 Mr Robert Arrigo – Spokesperson for Tourism
 Mr Charlo Bonnici – Spokesperson for Sustainable Development, the Environment and Climate change
 Dr Stephen Spiteri – Spokesperson for Employment and Rights of Persons with Disability
 Dr Michael Gonzi – Spokesperson for Animal Welfare
 Mr Anthony Bezzina – Spokesperson for Transport and Infrastructure
 Ms Claudette Buttigieg – Spokesperson for Social Dialogue and Civil Liberties
 Mr Ryan Callus – Spokesperson for Planning and Simplification of Administrative Processes 
 Mr Robert Cutajar – Spokesperson for Youth and Sport
 Ms Kristy Debono – Spokesperson for Competitiveness and Economic Growth
 Professor Albert Fenech – Spokesperson for Research and Innovation
 Mr Claudio Grech – Spokesperson for Health
 Dr Paula Mifsud Bonnici – Spokesperson for Competition and Consumer Affairs
 Dr Marthese Portelli – Spokesperson for European Affairs
 Mr Antoine Borg - Spokesperson for the EU Presidency 2017 and EU funds
 Committee of the Parliamentary Group for the South Chairperson: Dr Stephen Spiteri (Members: Mr Mario Galea, Dr Carm Mifsud Bonnici, Dr Jason Azzopardi, Mr Anthony Bezzina)

References

Politics of Malta